Nightlife legislation in New York City can refer to:

New York City Cabaret Card  (1920-1967)
New York City Cabaret Law (1926-2017)
2006 nightlife legislation in New York City (2006-present)

Nightlife in New York City
Law enforcement in New York City
Local government legislation
New York City law